Tequesquite Creek can mean:

 Tequesquite Creek (New Mexico), in New Mexico 
 Tequesquite Creek (Texas), a tributary of the Rio Grande in Texas 
 Tequesquite Arroyo, a tributary of the Santa Ana River in Riverside, California